Church of Saint Maurice may refer to several churches:

 Église Saint-Maurice, Annecy, France
 Church of Saint Maurice (Augsburg), in Augsburg, Germany
 Church of Saint Maurice (Berlin), in Berlin, Germany
 Church of Saint Maurice (Ebersmunster) in France
 Church of Saint Maurice (Hildesheim), in Hildesheim, Germany
 St Maurice's Church, Horkstow, England
 Church of Saint Maurice (Kroměříž), in Kroměříž, Czech Republic
 Church of Saint Maurice (Münster), in Münster, Germany
 Church of Saint Maurice (Olomouc), in the Czech Republic
 Église Saint-Maurice, Soultz-Haut-Rhin, in France
 Église Saint-Maurice, Soultz-les-Bains, in France
 St Maurice's Church, Winchester, England
 Church of Saint Maurice (Wrocław), in Wrocław, Poland
 Morizkirche (Coburg), in Coburg, Germany